Reshad de Gerus (born 1 July 2003) is a French racing driver from Réunion, currently competing in the European Le Mans Series for Cool Racing.

Early career

French F4 Championship
De Gerus drove in the French F4 Championship from 2018 to 2019. In his debut season, he took part in the Junior category, finishing runner-up to Théo Pourchaire with four wins and 16 podiums. In 2019, De Gerus competed in the full championship, where four wins, including one at the Pau Circuit, helped him to second in the standings.

FIA Motorsport Games
De Gerus represented Team France and the FFSA at the 2019 FIA Motorsport Games Formula 4 Cup where an Olympic style competition takes place with different categories of racing. De Gerus was driving in the Formula 4 Cup. After qualifying De Gerus was in 9th, just over 2 seconds off the pace. For the qualifying race he slipted back one place meaning Team France would start in 10th behind Team Russia. The race itself saw De Gerus finish 5th, 6.7 seconds behind 1st place Andrea Rosso (Team Italy).

Formula Renault Eurocup
In January 2020 it was announced that De Gerus would compete in the Formula Renault Eurocup for British team Arden Motorsport alongside Alex Quinn and Ugo de Wilde. While his teammates both finished inside the top ten in the standings, de Gerus would have a more difficult campaign, with only three points finishes seeing him end up 17th in the championship.

FIA Formula 3 Championship 
De Gerus graduated to Formula 3 in 2021, racing alongside Logan Sargeant and Enzo Fittipaldi at Charouz Racing System. He left the team after 12 races, having taken a best result of 13th in Barcelona.

Sportscar career

2022 
In February of 2022, it was announced that De Gerus has joined Team Duqueine for the European Le Mans Series campaign, racing for the French outfit alongside Richard Bradley and Memo Rojas. Following three rounds, where the team scored a best finish of sixth at Imola, de Gerus quit the series.

That year, the Frenchman also made his debut at the 24 Hours of Le Mans, thus becoming the first driver from the French Overseas Department of Réunion to compete in the event.

2023 
De Gerus returned to the ELMS in 2023, pairing up with José María López and Vladislav Lomko at Cool Racing.

Karting record

Karting career summary

Racing record

Racing career summary

* Season still in progress.

Complete French F4 Junior Championship results
(key) (Races in bold indicate pole position) (Races in italics indicate fastest lap)

Complete French F4 Championship results
(key) (Races in bold indicate pole position) (Races in italics indicate fastest lap)

Complete FIA Motorsport Games results

Complete Formula Renault Eurocup results 
(key) (Races in bold indicate pole position) (Races in italics indicate fastest lap)

Complete FIA Formula 3 Championship results 
(key) (Races in bold indicate pole position; races in italics indicate points for the fastest lap of top ten finishers)

Complete European Le Mans Series results 
(key) (Races in bold indicate pole position; results in italics indicate fastest lap)

24 Hours of Le Mans results

References

External links
 

2003 births
Living people
French racing drivers
Racing drivers from Réunion
Formula Renault Eurocup drivers
French F4 Championship drivers
Auto Sport Academy drivers
Arden International drivers
Charouz Racing System drivers
Motopark Academy drivers
24 Hours of Le Mans drivers
FIA Motorsport Games drivers
Euroformula Open Championship drivers
European Le Mans Series drivers